None Mage Sudu None is a 2015 Sri Lankan Sinhala comedy film directed by Eranga Senarathna and produced by D.D.R.D.S Samarasekara for Sri Jaya Cineroo. It stars Wilson Gunaratne and Anusha Damayanthi in lead roles along with Mahinda Pathirage and Mihira Sirithilaka. Music composed by Lasantha Jayasekara. It is the 1230th Sri Lankan film in the Sinhala cinema.

Plot

Cast
 Wilson Gunaratne as Hector 
 Anusha Damayanthi as Pabalu
 Mihira Sirithilaka as Manju
 Mahinda Pathirage as Sando
 Sanjula Diwarathne as Anju
 Sanju Rodrigo as Lasanda
 Manel Chandralatha as Prophecy telling lady
 Dayasiri Hettiarachchi as Fransic matchmaker

Soundtrack

References

2015 films
2010s Sinhala-language films